Suppressor may refer to:

Suppressor (firearms), an American neologism for a silencer
Flash suppressor, flash guard, device attached to the muzzle of a rifle 
Suppressor (genetics)
Suppressor mutation
Suppressor (electrical), device designed to react to sudden or momentary overvoltage